Martin Dwyer (born 28 June 1975 in Aintree, Liverpool, Merseyside) is an English Epsom Derby winning flat racing jockey having won the 2006 Vodafone Derby upon Sir Percy. This was his second classic success after winning The Oaks aboard Casual Look in 2003. Dwyer is married to Claire, daughter of horse racing trainer Willie Muir;

Awards and honours
 Lester Awards
 Flat Ride of the Year in 2003 (on Persian Punch in the Jockey Club Cup)
 Flat Ride of the Year in 2006 (on Sir Percy in the Epsom Derby)

Major wins
Great Britain
 Coronation Cup – (1) Pyledriver (2021) 
 Dewhurst Stakes – (1) – Sir Percy (2005)
 Epsom Derby – (1) – Sir Percy (2006)
 Epsom Oaks – (1) – Casual Look (2003)
 King's Stand Stakes – (1) – Dominica (2002)

Canada
 Canadian International Stakes – (1) – Phoenix Reach (2003)

Hong Kong
 Hong Kong Vase – (1) – Phoenix Reach (2004)

Italy
 Gran Criterium – (1) – Nayarra (2011)

United Arab Emirates
 Dubai Sheema Classic – (1) – Phoenix Reach (2005)

India
 McDowell's Indian Derby – (1) – In the Spotlight (2012)
 Kolkata Derby Stakes – (1) – In the Spotlight (2012)
 Kolkata Oaks – (1) – In the Spotlight (2012)

See also
List of jockeys

References

1975 births
English jockeys
Lester Award winners
Living people
People from Aintree
Sportspeople from Liverpool